Samuel Seabury (1801–1872) was an American Protestant Episcopal clergyman, grandson of Bishop Samuel Seabury. He was born at New London, Conn., was ordained priest in the Protestant Episcopal church (1828), was editor of The Churchman (1833–1849), rector of the Church of the Annunciation in New York City (1838–1868), and professor of biblical learning in the General Theological Seminary (1862–1872). He published: 
The Continuity of the Church of England in the Sixteenth Century (1853)
Supremacy and Obligation of Conscience (1860)
American Slavery Justified (1861)
The Theory and Use of the Church Calendar (1872)
Discourses on the Holy Spirit (edited by his son, with memoir, 1874)

See also 
William Jones Seabury

1801 births
1872 deaths
19th-century American Episcopalians
American religious writers
American proslavery activists
Writers from New London, Connecticut
General Theological Seminary faculty